Narcissus longispathus is a species of bulbous plant that is endemic to Spain.  Its natural habitat is rivers. It is threatened by habitat loss.

References

Bibliography

 Narcissus longispathus Herrera Lab., Spain

longispathus
Endemic flora of Spain
Endangered plants
Taxonomy articles created by Polbot